Willy Quadackers (26 July 1937 – 18 April 2020) was a Dutch footballer who played as a right back.

Career
Born in Hoensbroek, Quadackers played for Fortuna'54 and MVV. He also earned one cap for the Dutch national team in 1964.

Later life and death
Quadackers died on 18 April 2020, aged 82.

Honours
 KNVB Cup: 1963–64

References

1937 births
2020 deaths
Dutch footballers
Netherlands international footballers
Fortuna Sittard players
MVV Maastricht players
Eredivisie players
Association football fullbacks
EHC Hoensbroek players